Fruzsina Mayer (born 16 July 2000) is a Hungarian ice hockey player and member of the Hungarian national team,  playing in the European Women's Hockey League (EWHL) with KMH Budapest.

She represented Hungary at the IIHF Women's World Championship Top Division tournaments in 2021 and 2022.

Career statistics

International

References

External links 
 

2000 births
Living people
Expatriate ice hockey players in Canada
Hungarian expatriate sportspeople in Canada
Hungarian women's ice hockey defencemen
KMH Budapest (women) players
MAC Budapest (women) players